Alfred Charles Willis (3 February 1836 – 14 November 1920) was an Anglican missionary  bishop and author in the late 19th and early 20th centuries.

Biography 
Born the son of a physician, he was educated at Uppingham and St John's College, Oxford, and ordained in 1860. After a curacy in Strood, Kent, he was the incumbent at St Mark, New Brompton from 1863 until his appointment as the second bishop of Honolulu in 1872. He held this post for 30 years, until he retired to Tonga.

Willis was supportive of Liliʻuokalani, the last sovereign monarch of Hawaii, after her 1893 overthrow. Shortly after her release from house arrest in 1896, he baptised and confirmed the deposed queen.

References

1836 births
1920 deaths
Clergy from Lincolnshire
People educated at Uppingham School
Alumni of St John's College, Oxford
20th-century Anglican bishops in the United States
Episcopal bishops of Hawaii
Anglican missionaries in Hawaii
19th-century Anglican bishops in Oceania